Metamorphosiz: The End Remixes Vol. 1 is the first remix album by the Canadian rock and nu-metal Christian band Thousand Foot Krutch expected to be released in 2013, but on November 27, was confirmed the real release date. The album was released to iTunes on December 4, and contains remixed versions of the songs recorded in their The End Is Where We Begin album, besides the songs remixed on the TFK Remix EP.

History 
By the historic TFK chart on Billboard, Thousand Foot Krutch announced 2 free remixes to their fans., and on October 1 they released the free remixes, that were available for a month. By the great fan response, On November 1, through Facebook and Twitter, they announced the making of a remix album, and they confirmed the name.

On November 27, Thousand Foot Krutch announced through Facebook, the release date, and posted the official cover artwork.

Track listing

References 

2012 remix albums
Thousand Foot Krutch albums
2012 EPs